The Dardanoi (its anglicized modern terms being Dardanians or Dardans)  were a legendary people of the Troad, located in northwestern Anatolia. The Dardanoi were the descendants of Dardanus, the mythical founder of Dardanus, an ancient city in the Troad. A contingent of Dardanians figures among Troy's allies in the Trojan War. Homer makes a clear distinction between the Trojans and the Dardanoi, however, "Dardanoi"/"Dardanian" later became essentially metonymous–– or at least is commonly perceived to be so–– with "Trojan", especially in the works of Vergil such as the Aeneid.

Dardanoi and Trojans

The Royal House of Troy was also divided into two branches, that of the Dardanoi and that of the Trojans (their city being called Troy, or sometimes Ilion/Ilium). The House of the Dardanoi (its members being the Dardanids,) was older than the House of Troy, but Troy later became more powerful. Aeneas is referred to in Virgil's Aeneid interchangeably as a Dardanian or as a Trojan, but strictly speaking, Aeneas was of the branch of the Dardanoi. Many rulers of Rome, for example Julius Caesar and Augustus, claimed descent from Aeneas and the Houses of Troy and Dardania. Homer adds the epithet Dardanides (Δαρδανίδης) to Priam and to other prominent characters denoting that they are members of the house of the Dardanoi.  

Homer writes;

The Dardanians were led by brave Aeneas, whom the fair Aphrodite, a goddess bedded with a mortal man, bore to Anchises in the mountains of Ida. He was not alone, for with him were the two sons of Antenor, Archilochus and Acamas, both skilled in all the arts of war.

The strait of the Dardanelles was named after the Dardanoi, who lived in the region.

Origins
The ethnic affinities of the Dardanoi, and of the Trojans, and the nature of their language remain a mystery. The remains of their material culture reveal close ties with Luwian, other Anatolian groups, and Thracians. The Dardanoi were linked by ancient Greek and Roman writers with the Illyrian people of the same name who lived in the Balkans (i.e. the Dardani), a notion supported by a number of parallel ethnic names found both in the Balkans and Anatolia that are considered too great to be a mere coincidence (e.g. Eneti and Enetoi, Bryges and Phryges, Moesians and Mysians). Strabo described the Dardanoi as Illyrians and this view is also supported by modern scholars. Archaeological finds from the Troad dating back to the Chalcolithic period show striking affinity to archaeological finds known from the same era in Muntenia and Moldavia, and there are other traces which suggest close ties between the Troad and the Carpatho-Balkan region of Europe. Archaeologists in fact have stated that the styles of certain ceramic objects and bone figurines show that these objects were brought into the Troad by Carpatho-Danubian colonists; for example, certain ceramic objects have been shown to have Cucuteni origins. Egyptian records from the Battle of Qadesh refer to Hittite allies known as Drdny, likely referring to the Dardanoi.

Variations of the name
Homer in the Iliad carefully distinguishes the Dardanoi from the Trojans, not only in the list of Trojan allies (11:816–823) but also in the frequently repeated formula keklyte meu, Trôes kai Dardanoi ed' epikuroi (e.g., 3.456)".

Words used by Homer are:

Dardaniōnes, Δαρδανίωνες, denotes people of the Troad in general.
Dardanioi, Δαρδάνιοι, same as above.
Dardanides, Δαρδανίδης, a name given to Aenias, as a descendant of Dardanus; in Latin, the plural form is sometimes also used for Trojan women in the Aeneid.
Dardanoi, Δάρδανοι, descendants of Dardanus, but sometimes distinguished as descendants of Assarakos whose branch of the family, including Aineias, continued to count Dardanie (a non-urban settlement up in the foothills of Mt. Ida) as home rather than Ilios, the citadel by the sea (see 20.215ff. and 2.819-20n).

See also
Iliad

References

External links
The Iliad, translated in English
The Iliad, the original ancient Greek text

Ancient peoples of Anatolia
Trojans